Hemant Gupta (born 17 October 1957) is a former Judge of Supreme Court of India. He is also former Chief Justice of Madhya Pradesh High Court and Judge of Patna High Court and Punjab and Haryana High Court. He retired on 16 October 2022.

Career
Justice Gupta enrolled as an advocate in July 1980 and started practice in the District Court of Chandigarh. He entered in the High Court of Punjab and Haryana and worked on Civil, Labour, Company and Constitutional matters. In 1997 he was appointed Additional Advocate General of Punjab and elevated as a Judge of High Court of Punjab and Haryana on 2 July 2002. Justice Gupta was transferred to the Patna High Court in February 2016, thereafter took over the charge of acting chief justice of the Patna High Court after the retirement of Justice Iqbal Ahmed Ansari on 29 October 2016. He was appointed the Chief Justice of the Madhya Pradesh High Court on 18 March 2017. On 2 November 2018, he became Judge of the Supreme Court of India. He was retired on 16 October 2022.

References

1957 births
Living people
Chief Justices of the Madhya Pradesh High Court
Judges of the Patna High Court
Judges of the Punjab and Haryana High Court
20th-century Indian judges
21st-century Indian judges
Justices of the Supreme Court of India